Air Chief Marshal Sir William Gore Sutherland Mitchell,  (8 March 1888 – 15 August 1944) was a senior commander in the Royal Air Force (RAF) and the first RAF officer to hold the post of Black Rod.

RAF career
Commissioned into the Devonshire Regiment in 1906, Mitchell spent his early military years as an infantry subaltern. He attended the Central Flying School in 1913, being awarded his Royal Aero Club Aviator's Certificate no. 483 on 17 May 1913, before becoming a pilot in the Royal Flying Corps. During the First World War he saw rapid advancement, serving as Officer Commanding No. 10 Squadron, Officer Commanding 12th (Corps) Wing and Officer Commanding No. 20 Group.

After the war he moved to India and commanded No. 52 (Corps) Wing and No. 3 (Indian) Wing (subsequently redesignated No. 1 (Indian) Wing). He was appointed Officer Commanding, No. 1 Flying Training School in 1924, Group Captain – Administration at RAF Halton in 1925 and Officer Commanding Aden Command in 1928. He went on to be Director of Training at the Air Ministry in 1929 before being made Air Officer Commanding RAF Cranwell in 1933, Air Officer Commanding British Forces in Iraq in 1934 and Air Member for Personnel in 1937. 

Mitchell served in the Second World War as Air Officer Commanding-in-Chief RAF Middle East from March 1939, and then Inspector-General of the RAF before retiring in 1941.

In retirement Mitchell served as Gentleman Usher of the Black Rod. He held the post of Commandant of London Air Training Command from 1942 until his death in 1944 from a heart attack, at the age of 56 . He is buried in Putney Vale Cemetery, south west London.

References

Bibliography

External links
 

|-

|-

|-

|-

|-

|-

|-

1888 births
1944 deaths
Royal Air Force personnel killed in World War II
Military personnel from New South Wales
Devonshire Regiment officers
Highland Light Infantry officers
Royal Flying Corps officers
Royal Air Force air marshals
Knights Commander of the Order of the Bath
Commanders of the Order of the British Empire
Companions of the Distinguished Service Order
Recipients of the Military Cross
Recipients of the Air Force Cross (United Kingdom)
Aviation pioneers
Ushers of the Black Rod
Commandants of the Royal Air Force College Cranwell